San Polo Matese is a comune (municipality) in the Province of Campobasso in the Italian region Molise, located about  southwest of Campobasso.

San Polo Matese borders the following municipalities: Bojano, Campochiaro, Colle d'Anchise, San Gregorio Matese.

References

Cities and towns in Molise